The 1970–71 Western Kentucky Hilltoppers men's basketball team represented Western Kentucky University during the 1970–71 NCAA University Division men's basketball season. The Hilltoppers were led by Ohio Valley Conference Coach of the Year John Oldham and consensus All-American player Jim McDaniels.  WKU won the OVC season championship, as well as the conference's automatic bid to the 1971 NCAA University Division basketball tournament.  No conference tournament was held, so the conference bid was awarded to the season champion.  The Hilltoppers advanced to the NCAA Final Four, though the tournament games were later vacated by the NCAA due to McDaniels having signed a contract with an agent.

For the second consecutive year, McDaniels was OVC Player of the Year and set the school record for most points scored in season and career, and highest scoring average.  Jerry Dunn and Jim Rose joined McDaniels on the All-OVC Team.  This team was one of the most talented in school history with several players being drafted by the NBA and ABA including McDaniels, Dunn, Rose, Clarence Glover, and Jerome Perry.

Cultural Relevance
This year's Western Kentucky team was the first non-historically black Kentucky college to start five African-American players: McDaniels, Rose, Glover, Dunn, and Rex Bailey.   Coach Oldham was pressured, and even threatened, not to start all five together, but resisted the pressure saying "they are my best five players".

NCAA Sanctions
WKU's NCAA tournament games were later vacated by the NCAA after it was discovered that McDaniels had signed with a professional agent prior to the tournament.  "I admit I made a mistake," McDaniels told the Courier-Journal in an interview. "There was a lot of pressure. I got around some people who did not have my best interests at heart."  The sanctions reduced their officially recognized record to 20–5.

Schedule

|-
!colspan=6| Regular Season

|-

 

|-
!colspan=6| 1971 NCAA University Division basketball tournament

References

Western Kentucky Hilltoppers basketball seasons
Western Kentucky
NCAA Division I men's basketball tournament Final Four seasons
Western Kentucky
Western Kentucky Basketball, Men's
Western Kentucky Basketball, Men's